The Tales of an Old Drunkard, or The Drunken Man's Talk, is a 13th-century Chinese story collection from the early Yuan dynasty (1271–1368). It was written by Luo Ye (羅燁), a Luling County (盧陵; modern Ji'an County) native who became a resident of the Southern Song dynasty capital Lin'an Prefecture (modern Hangzhou).

The only extant copy was discovered in Japan in the early 20th century.

English translations

Yuan dynasty literature
Song dynasty literature
13th-century Chinese books
Chinese short story collections